Buxton is a former railway station which was located on the Picton – Mittagong loop railway line. It served Buxton, a small village in the Macarthur Region of New South Wales, Australia.

History
The station opened on 20 October 1893, and a platform was later added on 4 November (The current platform was built for by the RTM for their tourist service.1990s)
. The station along with the Loop Line was closed in 1978.

The station is located on a crossing loop. The station building has been demolished after burning down. Current platform and sign built 1990s.

Occasionally, the museum operates steam heritage trains on the line to the station, from Thirlmere & Picton.

Image gallery

References

Disused regional railway stations in New South Wales
Railway stations in Australia opened in 1893
Railway stations closed in 1978
Main Southern railway line, New South Wales